Sawai Singh Sisodiya (1919-2007) was an Indian politician. He was a Member of Parliament  representing Madhya Pradesh in the Rajya Sabha the upper house of India's Parliament as member  of the  Indian National Congress.

References

Rajya Sabha members from Madhya Pradesh
Indian National Congress politicians
1919 births
2007 deaths